Ayah Bdeir (born 1982 in Montreal, Quebec) is an entrepreneur, inventor, and interactive artist. She is the founder and CEO of littleBits. She is also the co-founder of Daleel Thawra, a directory of protests, initiatives, donations in Lebanon.

Early life 
Born in Canada and raised in Beirut, Bdeir credits her parents, her late father Saadi Bdeir, an entrepreneur and mother Randa Bdeir, a banker as her inspiration because they raised her and her sisters to love maths, science, and design and pursue their passions in the field of their choosing. Bdeir would take things apart, break them open to see what was inside.  She was given chemistry sets, and programming lessons on Commodore 64 when she was 12.  Her parents didn't believe in gender differences, championing their girls to be scientists and engineers, and push to be career women. (Bdeir's mother attended university to get her degree at the same time as her daughters were going to school.)

Education and career 

Bdeir earned a Masters of Science degree from the MIT Media Lab and undergraduate degrees in Computer Engineering and Sociology from the American University of Beirut. In 2008, she was awarded a fellowship at Eyebeam in New York City She has taught graduate classes at NYU's Interactive Telecommunications Program (ITP) and Parsons The New School for Design.
In 2010, Bdeir served as a design mentor on the reality TV show, Stars of Science.

In September 2011, Bdeir started littleBits Electronics, a startup with the goal to "put the power of electronics in the hands of everyone, and to break down complex technologies so that anyone can build, prototype, and invent." The company is based in New York with funding from such investors as True Ventures, Foundry Group, and Two Sigma.

In 2012, Bdeir received the TED Fellowship and gave a talk at the TED conference in Long Beach called "Building Blocks That Blink, Beep and Teach."

littleBits 
Bdeir is the founder and CEO of littleBits.

littleBits joined the 2016 Disney Accelerator program. It has also partnered with Savvas, one of the leading curriculum companies in the world to co-create curriculum to support their Science and Engineering program.

In 2014, Bdeir and her work with littleBits were included in the 35 Under 35 Coolest Entrepreneurs list by Inc.

In 2018, she and her work with littleBits were included in Inc.'s Top 5 Women to Watch in Robotics list.

In 2019, she was featured in BBC's "100 most influential women" for her contributions to close the gender gap in STEM.

Maker movement, Internet of Things and gender neutrality 
Bdeir was named to Popular Mechanics' 25 Makers Who Are Reinventing the American Dream in 2014 and has spoken at TED, SXSW, Solid, and CreativeMornings about the Maker Movement, the importance of democratizing technology, and the Internet of Things.

Bdeir is a proponent of the Open Hardware Movement, an initiative aimed at ensuring that technological knowledge is accessible to everyone, and co-founded the Open Hardware Summit, an annual conference organized by the Open Source Hardware Association. In 2010, Bdeir was awarded a fellowship with Creative Commons for her work in defining Open Hardware and for co-chairing the Open Hardware Summits of 2010 and 2011.

As a fellow at Creative Commons, she led the public competition for the Open Hardware logo—now adopted on millions of circuit boards around the world. Bdeir has published academic papers and coined the term "Electronics As Material," which is the idea of "thinking of electronics as material that can be combined with other traditional ones."

Bdeir is a proponent of Gender Neutrality in toys. Bdeir has said she is proud that 40% of the littleBits user base is girls, four times the average in STEM/STEAM.

Art works
Prior to littleBits, Bdeir worked as an interactive artist. She has exhibited work at the Peacock Visual Arts gallery (Aberdeen), the New Museum (New York), Ars Electronica (Linz) and the Royal College of Art (London).  Installations include:
 Elusive Electricity (Ejet Ejet)
 Teta Haniya's Secrets
 Les Annees Lumiere
 Arabiia
 Random Search

Shows and exhibitions
 "Subtitled: Narratives From Lebanon", RCA (Royal College of Art) (London), 2011
 "Talk To Me", MoMA (Museum of Modern Art) (New York), 2011
 "Electronics as Materials", Eyebeam (New York), 2010
 "7 on 7", New Museum (New York), 2010
 "Identities in Motion", Peacock Visual Arts Gallery (Aberdeen, Scotland), 2009
 "Impetus", Ars Electronica (Linz, Austria), Works from the MIT Media Lab, curated by Hiroshi Ishii & Amanda Parkes, 2009
 "Open Stitch", Location One Gallery (New York), 2005

Commissions 
 UFA Projection Mapping – Colors of an old Beirut 
 White – Source Companion
 The New Museum – Renegade Sculpture
 Beiteddine Festival – Guy Manoukian

References

External links

 littleBits
 Hillary Batchelder and Sarah Lilleyman, "No Escaping the Memories", Time, 29 July 2006
 Regine, "littleBits, pre-engineered circuit boards connected by tiny magnets", We Make Money Not Art, 14 May 2009
 Stars of Science website
 Profile on CNN The Next List 8 July 2012
 
  (TED2012)

1982 births
Living people
Artists from Montreal
Canadian conceptual artists
Women conceptual artists
Canadian people of Lebanese descent
Massachusetts Institute of Technology alumni
American University of Beirut alumni
Canadian women engineers
Canadian women company founders
21st-century women engineers
21st-century Canadian women artists
BBC 100 Women
Lebanese inventors
Activists